Andrew Rothstein (26 September 1898 – 22 September 1994) was a British journalist. A member of the Communist Party of Great Britain (CPGB), Rothstein was one of the leading public faces of the British Communist movement, serving as a member of the CPGB's political apparatus and through a series of publications and translations of Marxist-related topics.

Biography

Early years

Rothstein, who was to become a significant figure in British Communism, was born in London to Russian Jewish political emigrants. His subsequent life was always tinged by the identity of his father, the Soviet diplomat Theodore Rothstein (1871–1953), who had been forced to emigrate from Russia for political reasons. From 1890, Theodore Rothstein settled in Britain for the next 30 years.

Theodore joined the Social Democratic Federation in 1895, being very much part of its left wing; in 1901, he also joined the Russian Social Democratic and Labour Party (RSDLP) as a British-based member. The RSDLP would split into two factions, the Bolsheviks and Mensheviks and Rothstein would support the Bolsheviks. Lenin frequently visited Rothstein and his family on his own visits to London, as in 1905.

The SDF leader, Henry Hyndman, was acutely disturbed by Rothstein's election to the SDF executive in 1900, motivated in part by Hyndman's antisemitism. Rothstein and Zelda Kahan, who was also of Russian-Jewish origin, led the opposition inside the SDF to Hyndman's growing support for British re-armament policies due to the latter's opposition to German imperialism. Rothstein also supported the unity process that led to the formation in 1911, by a merger between a number of socialist groups and the SDF (which had become the Social Democratic Party in 1907) to create the British Socialist Party. Both the young Andrew and his father were strongly against the 1914-18 war. However, Theodore Rothstein was also working for the Foreign Office and the War Office as a Russian translator.

He was decisive in the move to oust the Hyndman national chauvinist current in the BSP in 1916 and also took part in founding of the Communist Party of Great Britain.  But he partly returned to Russia in 1920 and then increasingly became more involved in the new Russia to the extent that he remained there permanently. From 1921 to 1930 he was engaged in diplomatic work, starting with being the Soviet representative in Iran in 1921. He became Director of the Institute of World Economy and World Politics and, from 1939, was an Academician, receiving the Order of Lenin. Theodore also wrote a number of significant books, he wrote on Egypt, and his From Chartism to Labourism (1929) was a pioneering work on British labour and trade union history.

War service, education and foundation of the CPGB

After winning a London County Council scholarship, Andrew Rothstein studied History at Oxford and served in the Oxfordshire and Buckinghamshire Light Infantry and Hampshire Yeomanry from 1917 to 1919. He was a corporal when he discovered that his unit was about to be sent to Archangel, the Russian port where British troops had been sent to assist the Tsarist forces resistance to the new Soviet government, led by the Bolsheviks. Only one soldier volunteered to go to Russia, the rest stuck with Rothstein. This was the first of many rebellions and mutinies in the British Army against the intervention in Russia, involving up to 30,000 troops at its height, the history of which was later documented by Andrew Rothstein in his Soldiers' Strikes of 1919.

Andrew Rothstein was a foundation member of Communist Party in 1920 and was the man who recruited Tom Wintringham to the communist cause. Rothstein met Sylvia Pankhurst on several occasions and said that he thought her "energetic and sincere but in a one-sided way, she always had a bunch of devoted women around her but often would think nothing of intercepting propaganda material being brought for my father and printing them as articles in her own paper. She was an unscrupulous woman." At the suggestion of the Comintern, a second British Unity Congress was held, with Pankhurst's group participating. Although a merger ensued, Rothstein recalled events as that "she broke away again after about three months".

When Andrew Rothstein returned to Oxford, he found that he had been deprived of an army grant to assist his return to university and was thus unable to continue in postgraduate research. A stern letter from the Master and Fellows at Balliol announced that he must leave immediately. Twenty years later, when he met a former junior dean from those days, who told him that the Foreign Secretary, Lord Curzon had personally intervened in his case. Rothstein recalled: "He told me a letter was read out from Curzon, which said that I was a very dangerous Communist and must not be allowed to stay."

Career

On completing his university education in 1921, he became the London correspondent of ROSTA (later TASS), the Soviet news agency. He regularly wrote articles for the Party, the labour movement, and as a correspondent for the Soviet news agency as "C M Roebuck". At the 8th Congress of the CPGB, he was elected to the Executive Committee and Politburo but removed from the latter after six years membership when the 11th Congress in December 1929 took the CPGB on a left turn. Rothstein was "utterly against" the new line  but found himself appointed as deputy head of the Anglo-American department of the Red International of Labour Unions and served in the post for 18 months, based in Moscow.

From 1920 to 1945, he was press officer to the first Soviet mission in Britain, and then correspondent for the Soviet press agency TASS, in London, Geneva and elsewhere. He became an authority on Soviet history, economy, institutions and foreign relations and began to publish widely: e.g. The Soviet Constitution (1923), Problems of Peace (essays on Soviet foreign policy, 1936–8), Workers in the Soviet Union (1942), Man and Plan in the Soviet Economy (1948).

Andrew Rothstein was President of the Foreign Press Association, from 1943 to 1950 and, after the war, was the London correspondent of Czechoslovakian trade union paper, Prace, a post he held until 1970. From 1946, he lectured at London University's School of Slavonic and East European Studies but was dismissed on spurious grounds in 1950 in an affair that had the feel of a McCarthyite purge about it. In this period, he published A History of the USSR (1950) and Peaceful Coexistence (1955).

Rothstein translated many Marxist texts from the Russian into English; for example, Plekhanov's In defence of materialism, segments of Lenin's Collected Works, such as, for the 4th English edition (1963), a report on the meeting of the editorial board of the journal "Proletary" in 1909 and Ponomaryov's History of the Communist Party of the Soviet Union, first published in English in 1960 by the Foreign Languages Publishing House, Moscow

Later life

Rothstein was awarded a Soviet pension in 1970 and, after formal retirement, was chair of the Marx Memorial Library and vice-chair of the British-Soviet Friendship Society. He also wrote and published widely; there was an account of the origins and background of the building that houses the Marx Memorial Library, A house on Clerkenwell Green (1972), and material that he had first hand knowledge of: When Britain Invaded Soviet Russia: the Consul Who Rebelled (1979) and The Soldier's Strikes of 1919 (1980).

A Communist all his life, he was a critic of the drive to revisionism in the CPGB of the 1980s and wrote, with Robin Page Arnot, another veteran communist, a piece entitled The British Communist Party and Euro-Communism for the CPUSA's Political Affairs, published in October 1985, which asserted that there was a manufactured crisis in British Communism. He was proud to be the recipient of card number one of the re-established Communist Party of Britain in 1988. His last published article was for the CPB's Communist Review, on British Communists and the Comintern 1919-1929, printed in the summer of 1991. Andrew Rothstein died on 22 September 1994, aged 95.

Footnotes

Works 

 The Soviet Constitution, 1923
 Man and Plan in Soviet Economy, 1948
 A History of the U.S.S.R., 1950
 A People Reborn: The Story of North Ossetia, 1954 (as editor)
 Peaceful Coexistence, 1955
 The Munich Conspiracy, 1958
 A House on Clerkenwell Green. Lawrence & Wishart, London 1966.

Further reading

 L. Hussey, "Mr. Rothstein and the Soviet Union," The New Reasoner, vol. 1, no. 1 (Summer 1957), pp. 65–70.
 Morning Star, 29 September 1988

External links 
 Compendium of Communist Biography by surname

1898 births
1994 deaths
British male journalists
British people of Lithuanian-Jewish descent
Communist Party of Britain members
Communist Party of Great Britain members
Jewish socialists
Russian journalists
British Yeomanry soldiers
Hampshire Yeomanry soldiers
20th-century British journalists
British Army personnel of World War I
British mutineers